Spotted stream frog may refer to:

 Pulchrana picturata
 Hylarana signata

See also
 Sylvirana nigrovittata, the black-striped frog
 Spotted frog (disambiguation)
 Stream frog (disambiguation)